Molecular Therapy is a scientific journal, published by Cell Press, that aims to develop and explore "molecular and cellular therapeutics to correct genetic and acquired diseases". 

The founder of the journal and its Editor-in-Chief in the first five years was Inder Verma.

References

External links
 

Cell Press academic journals
Monthly journals
Publications established in 2000
Genetics journals